Honoraville  is an unincorporated community in Crenshaw County, Alabama, United States, located  northwest of Luverne. Honoraville has a post office with ZIP code 36042.

References

Unincorporated communities in Crenshaw County, Alabama
Unincorporated communities in Alabama